This page describes the knockout stage of the 2013–14 EHF Cup.

Quarterfinals
The draw was held on 1 April 2014 at 12:15 in Vienna, Austria. The first legs are played on 19–21 April, and the second legs on 26–27 April 2014.

Ranking of the second-placed teams
The ranking of the second-placed teams is carried out on the basis of  the team's results in the group stage. Because the German side Füchse Berlin, the organizers of the Final 4 tournament, finished on top of their group they qualified directly to the final tournament and only the top three second-placed teams qualified to the quarter-finals.

Seedings

Matches

|}

First leg

Second leg

Final Tournament

Semifinals

References

External links
Official website

EHF Cup seasons
2014 in handball